Notiohyphantes excelsus is a species of spiders in the family Linyphiidae. It is found from Mexico to Peru, Brazil and on the Galapagos Islands.

References 

 Notiohyphantes excelsus at the World Spider Catalog

Linyphiidae
Spiders described in 1886
Spiders of South America
Fauna of the Galápagos Islands